This is a list of lighthouses in Saint Pierre and Miquelon.

Lighthouses

See also
 Lists of lighthouses and lightvessels

References

External links
 

Saint Pierre and Miquelon
Lighthouses
Transport in Saint Pierre and Miquelon
Buildings and structures in Saint Pierre and Miquelon